Claude K. Tudor Jr. is a United States Air Force brigadier general who serves as the Chief of Staff of the Pacific Air Forces. Previously, he served as the Director of Air Force Resilience of the United States Air Force and, prior to that, he was the Commander of the 24th Special Operations Wing.

In April 2021, he was assigned as chief of staff of the Pacific Air Forces, replacing Jennifer Short.

References

External links

Year of birth missing (living people)
Living people
Place of birth missing (living people)
United States Air Force generals